Beginning in 1867, following the conclusion of the American Civil War, the Republican Party has run a candidate for the Governor of Kentucky. William O'Connell Bradley was the first Republican to serve as Governor of the state, winning the 1895 Kentucky gubernatorial election. As of 2020, nine Republicans have sat as Governor of Kentucky.

List 
1867 - Sidney M. Barnes (Estill)
1868 SPECIAL ELECTION - Richard Tarvin Baker (Campbell)
1871 – John Marshall Harlan (Jefferson)
1875 – John Marshall Harlan (Jefferson)
1879 – Walter Evans (Jefferson)
1883 – Thomas Zantzinger Morrow (Pulaski)
1887 – William O. Bradley (Garrard)
1891 – Andrew T. Wood
1895 – William O. Bradley (Garrard)
1899 – William S. Taylor (Butler)
1900 SPECIAL ELECTION – John Yerkes (Boyle)
1903 – Morris B. Belknap (Jefferson)
1907 - Augustus Everett Willson (Jefferson)
1911 – Edward C. O'Rear (Montgomery)
1915 – Edwin P. Morrow (Pulaski)
1919 – Edwin P. Morrow (Pulaski)
1923 – Charles I. Dawson (Logan)
1927 – Flem D. Sampson (Knox)
1931 – William B. Harrison (Jefferson)
1935 – King Swope (Fayette)
1939 – King Swope (Fayette)
1943 – Simeon S. Willis (Boyd)
1947 – Eldon S. Dummit (Fayette)
1951 – Eugene Siler (Whitley)
1955 – Edwin R. Denney (Rockcastle)
1959 – John M. Robsion, Jr. (Jefferson)
1963 – Louie B. Nunn (Barren)
1967 – Louie B. Nunn (Barren)
1971 – Tom Emberton (Metcalfe)
1975 – Bob Gable (Franklin)
1979 – Louie B. Nunn (Barren)
1983 – Jim Bunning (Campbell)
1987 – John Harper (Bullitt)
1991 – Larry Hopkins (Fayette)
1995 – Larry Forgy (Fayette)
1999 – Peppy Martin (Hart)
2003 – Ernie Fletcher (Fayette)
2007 – Ernie Fletcher (Fayette)
2011 – David L. Williams (Cumberland)
2015 – Matt Bevin (Jefferson)
2019 – Matt Bevin

Nominees,Rep
Governor,nominees,Rep
Kentucky Governor,Rep
+
Republican Party (United States)-related lists